The 1927 Chicago Cardinals season was their eighth in the National Football League. The team failed to improve on their previous output of 5–6–1, winning only three games. They finished ninth in the league.

Schedule

Standings

References

Arizona Cardinals seasons
Chicago Cardinals
Chicago